This is a list of schools of United States community colleges that offer a football program. The two largest associations are the National Junior College Athletic Association (NJCAA) and California Community College Athletic Association (CCCAA).

In the NJCAA, of 512 member colleges, 53 sponsored a football program, as of November, 2021.  This reflects the elimination of football at seven Arizona community colleges in 2018; one in Minnesota and one in North Dakota in 2019;  and one in Kansas in 2021. 

In California, of 114 community colleges in the state, 66 sponsored a football program under the auspices of the CCCAA, as of November, 2021. This reflects the suspension of football at two CCCAA member institutions in 2020. 

As shown below, the NJCAA is organized into five conferences (or leagues): Kansas Jayhawk Community College Conference; Minnesota College Athletic Conference; Mississippi Association of Community & Junior Colleges; Northeast JC Football Conference; Southwest Junior College Football Conference; as well as Independents (no conference/league affiliation.)

The CCCAA divides its membership into two regions: Northern and Southern. Each region is divided into the National Conference and the American Conference. In Northern California, there are three conferences/leagues in the National and two in the American; in Southern California, there are three conferences/leagues in both the National and the American.

NJCAA football programs

New Members

CCCAA Football Programs

Northern California Football Association programs

Southern California Football Association programs

See also
List of Division 1 NJCAA schools
List of Division 2 NJCAA schools
List of Division 3 NJCAA schools

References

External links
 Football at the website of the National Junior College Athletic Association
 Football at the website of California Community College Athletic Association

Community College